Farid Mellouli (born 7 July 1984) is an Algerian retired football player who played as a centre back.

Club career
Mellouli was born in Sétif. On July 21, 2010, Mellouli signed a two-year contract with ASO Chlef.

Honours
ASO Chlef
 Algerian Ligue Professionnelle 1: 2011–12

ES Sétif
 CAF Champions League: 2014
 CAF Super Cup: 2015
 Algerian Ligue Professionnelle 1: 2014–15

References

External links
 
 

1984 births
Living people
Algerian footballers
Algerian Ligue Professionnelle 1 players
Algerian expatriate footballers
Algerian expatriate sportspeople in Saudi Arabia
Al-Qadsiah FC players
ASO Chlef players
MC El Eulma players
OMR El Annasser players
USM Sétif players
ES Sétif players
US Biskra players
CS Constantine players
Saudi Professional League players
Association football defenders
Footballers from Sétif
21st-century Algerian people